Gavin Seager (born 18 December 1978) is a racing driver; he has raced the #54 pickup since 1998 in the UK Pickup Truck Racing series. He has won the Pickup Truck Racing championship three times; first in 2002 and then in 2004,and again in 2008, and has also taken the runner up position twice in 2001 and 2003. On 24 June 2007 Gavin became the all-time career top points scorer, taking the position away from Pete Wilkinson. Gavin won the 2008 championship, making him the first driver in the series to take three overall titles.

In 2012 Gavin suffered from prolonged depressive episodes which subsequently led to several failed attempts to kill himself. Gavin faced further difficulties in 2014 when he was arrested and convicted of arson. The target was Barnards VW garage in Station Road West, Stowmarket where he left more than £40,000 worth of damages in his wake. The blaze was started on 13 November by Seager out of a "misplaced sense of loyalty" to his brother-in-law who had "a beef" with Barnards about a problem with his car not being covered by a warranty, said Andrew Thompson, prosecuting. Gavin was given a 10-month prison sentence, suspended for 12 months, and ordered to do 80 hours unpaid work in the community.

Career history
2008 pickup Truck Racing Championship – won both the oval and overall championships
2007 Pickup Truck Racing Championship – 3rd overall, most wins and the most number of fastest laps.
2006 Pickup Truck Racing Championship – 6th place overall: 5 wins, 3 fastest laps (including Croft lap record)
2005 SCSA Stock Car Championship, runner up in rookie championship, 2 podiums
2005 Pickup Truck Racing – limited programme; two rounds, two wins
2004 Pickup Truck Racing – 4 fastest laps (Nurburgring & Oulton Park lap records)
2003 Pickup Truck Racing – runner up, Two fastest laps
2002 Pickup Truck Racing – overall champion, 4 fastest laps
2001 Pickup Truck Racing – runner up 3 wins, 2 fastest laps
2000 Pickup Truck Racing – 5th place 1 win
1999 Pickup Truck Racing – first full season 11th place
1998 Pickup Truck Racing – 1 meeting

Pre Pickups: Ministox, Stock Rods and National Hot Rods

References

External links
 Official Team Website

English racing drivers
Living people
1978 births
ASCAR drivers
Renault UK Clio Cup drivers